Martin Hašek (born 3 October 1995) is a Czech professional footballer who plays as a midfielder for Ekstraklasa side Wisła Płock.

Career
He made his senior league debut for Pardubice on 2 August 2014 in a Czech National Football League 1–1 home draw against Vlašim. He scored his first goal on 13 November in a 1–0 home win against Frýdek-Místek. In July 2017, he moved to Bohemians 1905 after being there on loan the last season. Sparta secured a buy-back option. 

On 28 December 2018, Hašek signed a two-and-a-half-year contract with Sparta Prague. On 27 January 2020, Hašek refused to travel with the first team to the training camp in Spain. In February, he was moved to reserve team. On 12 March 2020, Hašek delivered unilateral termination of the professional contract to the club. On 23 October 2020, the Board of Arbitrators of the FAČŘ decided that Hašek must pay EUR 800,000 to Sparta, as they examined the termination of the professional contract by Hašek as unjustified. On 28 November 2022, CAS upheld the previous verdict, but reduced the fine to an amount exceeding EUR 94,000 (CZK 2,250,000) + 10 percent per year as interest on late payment.

On 5 January 2021, after almost ten months without a club, Hašek signed a contract with a team sitting on the bottom of the 2. Bundesliga table, Würzburger Kickers.

On 28 February 2023 Hašek signed a half-year contract with Wisła Płock in the Ekstraklasa.

Personal life
He is the son of the Czech international footballer of the same name, and the nephew of former ice hockey goalkeeper Dominik Hašek.

References

External links 
 
 Martin Hašek official international statistics
 
 Martin Hašek profile on the Bohemians 1905 official website

1995 births
Living people
Czech footballers
Sportspeople from Liberec
Association football midfielders
Czech Republic youth international footballers
Czech Republic under-21 international footballers
AC Sparta Prague players
FK Pardubice players
FK Viktoria Žižkov players
FC Sellier & Bellot Vlašim players
Bohemians 1905 players
Würzburger Kickers players
Büyükşehir Belediye Erzurumspor footballers
Wisła Płock players
Czech First League players
Czech National Football League players
2. Bundesliga players
TFF First League players
Czech expatriate footballers
Expatriate footballers in Germany
Czech expatriate sportspeople in Germany
Expatriate footballers in Turkey
Czech expatriate sportspeople in Turkey
Expatriate footballers in Poland
Czech expatriate sportspeople in Poland